Palleturi Chinnodu is a 1974 Indian Telugu-language drama film, produced and directed by B. Vittalacharya under the Sri Vittal Productions & Co banner. It stars N. T. Rama Rao, Krishnam Raju and Manjula, with music composed by K. V. Mahadevan. The film is a remake of the Kannada film Chinnada Gombe (1964).

Plot
In a village, there lives a young & energetic guy, Lakshmana (N. T. Rama Rao) along with his elder brother Ramaiah (S. V. Ranga Rao), sister-in-law Janaki (Devika) and younger sister Shanta (Vijaya Lalitha). Lakshmana is unemployed, simple-minded, and a trouble-maker, while Ramaiah runs the house by making clay idols. Lakshmana is a great devotee of Lord Hanuman and takes an oath that he will also lead a bachelor's life. Dharmaraju (Satyanarayana) the landlord in the village, runs the wholesale market who makes a lot of atrocities. Lakshmana brings out his illegal business and makes his shop sealed. Meanwhile, Janaki's sister Leela (Manjula) visits their house who loves Lakshmana and makes him agree for the marriage.  At the same time, Ramanna sees an alliance for Shanta, for which Ramaiah pledges jewelry at Dharmaraju, but he cheats him when angered Lakshmana moves towards Dharmaraju. Frightened, Dharmaraju gives back the jewelry, after that, he gives a police complaint and Ramaiah gets arrested when Janaki & Leela give back the jewelry. Frustrated Ramaiah, asks his brother to leave the house and he takes Shanta also by promising he will perform her marriage grandly. Lakshmana heads for the city and acquires a job at a Zamindar's (Mikkilineni) house. Zamindar's son Prasad (Krishnam Raju) loves Shanta and everyone agrees to their marriage. Meanwhile, Dharmaraju's eye falls on Leela, so, he lures her mother Parvatamma (Girija) and forcibly makes their marriage arrangements. But Leela escapes with the help of Dharmaraju's nephew Appa Rao (Raja Babu), She too heads for the city and finds her beloved Lakshmana. On the other side, misfortune befalls, Dharmaraju auctions Ramaiah's house and throws them out of the village. The Zamindar makes marriage arrangements of Lakshmana & Leela and Prasad & Shanta. During the time of marriage, the separated siblings reunite when Dharmaraju claims Leela as his wife, but Appa Rao proves it as false. Finally, the movie ends on a happy note with the united family.

Cast
N. T. Rama Rao as Lakshmana
Krishnam Raju as Prasad
Manjula as Leela
S. V. Ranga Rao as Ramaiah
Satyanarayana as Dharma Raju
Allu Ramalingaiah as Postman Poolaiah
Raja Babu as Appa Rao
Mikkilineni as Zamindar 
Balakrishna
Devika as Janaki
Vijaya Lalitha as Shanta
Pandari Bai as Zamindar's wife 
Girija as Konadaveedu Parvatham

Soundtrack

Music composed by K. V. Mahadevan.

References

External links 
 

Indian drama films
Telugu remakes of Kannada films
Films scored by K. V. Mahadevan
1970s Telugu-language films
Films directed by B. Vittalacharya